Nikolaus's mouse (Megadendromus nikolausi) is a species of rodent in the family Nesomyidae.  It is the only species in the genus Megadendromus.
It is found only in Ethiopia. Its natural habitat is subtropical or tropical high-altitude shrubland. It is threatened by habitat loss.

References

Endemic fauna of Ethiopia
Dendromurinae
Mammals of Ethiopia
Mammals described in 1978
Taxonomy articles created by Polbot
Ethiopian montane moorlands